Gemzøe is a Danish surname. Notable people with the surname include:

 Jacob Gemzøe (1896–1986), Danish chess master
 Peter Gemzøe (1811–1879), Danish painter and lithographer

Danish-language surnames